Jerry Yeagley (born January 10, 1940 in Lebanon, Pennsylvania) is a former soccer player and coach.  He was the coach of the Indiana Hoosiers men's soccer team from 1973 to 2003. His teams won six NCAA Championships and a Division I record 544 games. He is considered the most successful collegiate soccer coach in the history of the sport. His overall career record was 544-101-45 (.828). He never had a losing season as a head coach. Yeagley was also an NCAA Champion in soccer as a player, winning the national championship with West Chester in 1961.

Coaching career
After earning a Master's degree from the University of Pittsburgh in 1963, Yeagley went to Indiana University as a Physical Education instructor and men's soccer coach. The team had been a club since 1947, but Yeagley's goal was to develop it into a varsity program. For ten years, with no money from the University for Yeagley's salary, team travel expenses, recruiting or uniforms, Yeagley, his wife Marilyn and the players lined the field, hung signs on campus and washed the players' uniforms.

Once the program gained varsity status and the full support of the university in 1973, Yeagley's teams quickly became a national power. Indiana reached the NCAA final in just its fourth season as a varsity program in 1976. In fact, through his 31-year career, Yeagley took every one of his four-year players to the NCAA College Cup, soccer's version of the Final Four. His teams made 28 NCAA tournament appearances, 16 appearances in the College Cup, and 12 appearances in the national final, while winning 10 Big Ten championships and 6 National championships — 1982, 1983, 1988, 1998, 1999, 2003 — the last one in his final season.

From 1973 through 2003 no team won more NCAA Championships or appeared in more College Cups than Indiana. The Hoosiers' longest stint away from the national semifinal was three years (1985–87) and they followed that brief drought by winning the 1988 NCAA crown. Yeagley led the Hoosiers to 28 NCAA Tournament berths, the third-most in NCAA history, including one in each of his final 17 seasons. His Hoosier teams owned a 68-22 (.756) record in tournament play, the best winning percentage of any school.

Yeagley's career came to a fitting and magical end in 2003 as his Hoosiers went unbeaten over their final 18 games and winning the NCAA Championship. The title was the sixth for the program under Yeagley and in the process, he became the all-time winningest coach in collegiate soccer history with 544 wins.

Legacy

Honors and recognition
Yeagley won NSCAA National Coach of the Year honors an unprecedented six times (1976, 1980, 1994, 1998, 1999, 2003). He was named Big Ten Coach of the Year an unmatched eight times (1993, 1994, 1997, 1998, 1999, 2001, 2002, 2003). In 1989, he earned the highest honor a college coach can receive when he was inducted into the United States Soccer Federation Hall of Fame. Yeagley received the prestigious Bill Jeffrey Award in 1987, given for his unique contributions to intercollegiate soccer. In 1997, he received the NSCAA's Honor Award, the organization's highest tribute. In 2008, he was inducted into the NSCAA Hall of Fame.

Upon his retirement in 2003, the soccer field at Indiana was renamed "Jerry Yeagley Field at Bill Armstrong Stadium".

In 2005, NSCAA honored him with an award in his namesake, the Jerry Yeagley Award.

Coaching tree
Yeagley has helped inspire a number of his players to become coaches. There are more than 20 former IU players or coaches in the collegiate coaching ranks, while professional coaches who played under Yeagley include Caleb Porter, Mike Anhaeuser, Juergen Sommer and Pat Noonan.

Yeagley's son Todd played for him at Indiana from 1991 to 1994, winning the 1994 Hermann Trophy from the Missouri Athletic Club and being named a First-Team All-American. After playing for the Columbus Crew of Major League Soccer from 1996 to 2002, Todd returned to Indiana as a volunteer assistant coach during his father's last season. On December 18, 2009, Todd Yeagley was named Head Coach at Indiana.

References

 Jerry Yeagley - Class of 1989. National Soccer Hall of Fame
 Jerry Yeagley. West Chester University Hall of Fame

1940 births
Living people
American soccer coaches
Indiana Hoosiers men's soccer coaches
National Soccer Hall of Fame members
University of Pittsburgh alumni
West Chester University alumni
People from Lebanon, Pennsylvania